James Clugnet (born 4 December 1996) is a British cross-country skier. He competed in the sprint at the 2022 Winter Olympics.

Cross-country skiing results
All results are sourced from the International Ski Federation (FIS)

Olympic Games

Distance reduced to 30 km due to weather conditions.

World Championships

World Cup

Season standings

References

External links

1996 births
Living people
British male cross-country skiers
Cross-country skiers at the 2022 Winter Olympics
Olympic cross-country skiers of Great Britain
Sportspeople from Grenoble´
French people of British descent